Arawacus jada, known generally as the creamy stripe-streak or nightshade hairstreak, is a species of hairstreak in the butterfly family Lycaenidae.

The MONA or Hodges number for Arawacus jada is 4330.

References

Further reading

External links

 

Arawacus
Articles created by Qbugbot
Butterflies described in 1867